Joseph Andrew Enochs (born September 1, 1971) is an American former professional soccer player who spent the majority of his career at German club VfL Osnabrück. He began his professional career with the San Francisco United All Blacks before moving to Germany to sign with FC St. Pauli. He never played for the first team and moved to Osnabrück in 1996. Enochs earned one cap with the United States national team in 2001.

College
Enochs attended California State University, Sacramento, where he played soccer from 1989 to 1992. He finished his four years at Sac State with nine goals and fifteen assists in 71 games.

Club career

All Blacks
After finishing his career with Sac State, Enochs signed with the U.S. Third Division (USISL) San Francisco United All Blacks and played until the summer of 1994.

St. Pauli
In 1994, Enochs received a phone call from a former Sac State teammate Mark Baena. Baena was playing in Germany and was looking for a roommate. Enochs decided to take Baena up on his offer and moved to Germany. Enochs later explained, "I was going to come home after the first year [in Germany], but I was having too much fun." In 1994, Enochs signed with St. Pauli. The team placed him with its Fourth Division amateur farm team. The next season, Enochs and his team mates had moved to the third-tier Regionalliga Nord for the 1995–96 season where he played in 34 games, scoring one goal. He performed well enough that he was offered a position on St. Pauli's first team, but he decided to move to third-tier club VfL Osnabrück in 1996.

Osnabrück
Enochs quickly established himself at Osnabrück, seeing time in 30 games in the 1996–97 season. He never played less than 39 games a season as he was selected as team co-captain. In 2000, Osnabrück earned promotion to the Second Division, but was back in the third tier the next season. The team won promotion again in 2003 and again in 2007, this time in the last game of the season. Enochs broke the club record for games played on May 19, 2007. In June 2007, he signed a one-year extension to his contract.

Enochs won the "Goal of the Month" award of German television network ARD's Sportschau in September 2004 for his strike against eventual cup winners Bayern Munich in the second round of the 2004–05 DFB-Pokal.

At the beginning of the 2007–08 season, his club opened a special section for children on the West stand of the stadium, that is named after Enochs. He retired at the end of the 2007–08 season.

International career
Enochs earned his only cap with the U.S. national team in a June 7, 2001, scoreless tie with Ecuador. Enochs came on for Tony Sanneh in the sixty-second minute. He left the game in the ninety-first minute after suffering a gash to his forehead during a collision. Richie Williams came on for him.

Managerial career

Zwickau
For the 2018–19 season he was signed as the head coach of FSV Zwickau. In February 2023, he was sacked.

Personal life
Enochs met his wife, Gunilla, a few months after he arrived in Germany through a blind date. That led to marriage and the birth of his daughter, Emily. 

Enochs is the uncle of American baseball player Spencer Enochs Torkelson. 

In 2008, Enochs opened a bar in the historic part of Osnabrück.

Managerial statistics

References

External links

Cal State-Sacramento stats

1971 births
Living people
People from Petaluma, California
Association football midfielders
American soccer players
Soccer players from California
United States men's international soccer players
USISL players
Sacramento State Hornets men's soccer players
San Francisco United All Blacks players
FC St. Pauli players
VfL Osnabrück players
2. Bundesliga players
American soccer coaches
2. Bundesliga managers
3. Liga managers
VfL Osnabrück managers
FSV Zwickau managers
American expatriate soccer players
American expatriate soccer coaches
American expatriate soccer players in Germany
Expatriate football managers in Germany